Kurtz may refer to:

Name
 Kurtz (Heart of Darkness), main character of Joseph Conrad's novel Heart of Darkness
 Colonel Kurtz, main character in the 1979 film Apocalypse Now
 Kurtz (surname)

Places

United States
 Kurtz, Indiana
 Kurtz, Michigan
 Kurtz Township, Minnesota
 Kurtz's Mill Covered Bridge, Lancaster County, Pennsylvania

See also 
 Kurz (disambiguation)
 6629 Kurtz, a main-belt asteroid
 Cowchock Wapner Kurtz syndrome